Mark Petch Motorsport was a motor racing team that competed in Australian and New Zealand motorsport.

History
Mark Petch Motorsport was formed in 1985 by former New Zealand National Championship winner Mark Petch who by 1985 had become a wealthy designer and manufacturer of industrial seals. A Volvo 240T was imported from Belgium and debuted at the 1985 Wellington 500 with Robbie Francevic and former Works Volvo driver Michel Delcourt taking victory despite the car not arriving in time for qualifying and only turning in a small number of laps in the final practice session. Their non-appearance in qualifying resulted in the car starting from the rear of the field, though within approximately 5 laps Delcourt had sliced through the field to be in 5th place Francevic then drove the car in the 1985 Australian Touring Car Championship recording wins at Symmons Plains and Oran Park before teaming with John Bowe at the Sandown 500 and Bathurst 1000.

Francevic drove the 240T to victories in the opening two rounds of the 1986 Australian Touring Car Championship, with the team's Australian assets then sold to the John Sheppard run Volvo Dealer Team. Mark Petch Motorsport then purchased an ex Andy Rouse Ford Sierra XR4Ti, with Francevic driving the car at the 1986 Bathurst 1000 in partnership with fellow Kiwi Leo Leonard. Francevic made a bold pre-race prediction that the turbo Ford, which had proven to be very fast (but fragile) in the 1986 European Touring Car Championship, would claim pole position at Bathurst. However, various problems in getting the Sierra to run properly saw Francevic 21st on the grid some 6 seconds slower than Gary Scott's pole winning time in his turbocharged Nissan Skyline RS DR30. The race was just as bad for the team with Francevic forced to park the car after only 27 laps with transmission failure.

In 1987, Mark Petch Motorsport purchased the Bigazzi BMW M3 raced by Olivier Grouillard, Altfrid Heger and Winni Vogt at the 1987 Bathurst 1000 which was a round of that years inaugural World Touring Car Championship. Following Bathurst, the M3 was then driven to victory in the 1987 (November) Pukekohe 500 in the hands of 1985 European Touring Car Champion Gianfranco Brancatelli and 1986 Bathurst 1000 winner Allan Grice.

In 1988, Mark Petch purchased a Wolf Racing Ford Sierra RS500 with Armin Hahne co-driving at the Bathurst 1000 and Wellington 500. After running strongly in the top 3 for over 70 laps, the car was retired on lap 103.

In 1989, Francevic competed in two rounds of the Australian Touring Car Championship before being joined by Gianfranco Brancatelli at Bathurst and Wellington. In 1990, the car was raced at Bathurst by Brancatelli and Robb Gravett.

In 1991, the Sierra was raced at Wellington by Brett Riley and Kayne Scott and in 1992 by Scott and Greg Murphy. A second Sierra was purchased from Dick Johnson Racing at the end of 1991.

Mark Petch Motorsport later became involved in New Zealand TraNZam racing and the New Zealand V8 Series winning the latter three times before being disbanded at the end of 2009.

References

New Zealand auto racing teams
Auto racing teams established in 1985
Auto racing teams disestablished in 2009
Sports teams in New Zealand
1985 establishments in New Zealand
2009 disestablishments in New Zealand